Cameron Gipp (born April 28, 1973), better known by his stage name Big Gipp, is an American rapper from Atlanta. He is best known for his work as a founding member of Goodie Mob, which he has gone on to release six studio albums.

Aside from Goodie Mob, Gipp's solo album Mutant Mindframe was released in 2003. He is also closely associated with Nelly and particularly Ali of the St. Lunatics, which the latter and Gipp he formed the duo Ali & Gipp.

Background 
Big Gipp, who is a Southern rapper, hails from the hotbed of the genre, Atlanta. He is known for his slow, drawn-out rapping dialect with political and street-life themed lyrics. The public first heard him rap on Outkast's debut album, Southernplayalisticadillacmuzik, on the song "Git Up, Git Out".

Goodie Mob 
He later rose to prominence as one-fourth of the Dungeon Family-affiliated group Goodie Mob along with Cee-Lo, T-Mo, and Khujo. The group released four albums to critical and commercial success. After a brief stint away from Goodie Mob, he rejoined the group along with Cee-Lo to reconstruct the once estranged quartet. They are currently in the studio planning to release a new album.

Ali & Gipp 
Big Gipp and St. Lunatics member Ali released a collaborative album, Kinfolk. A single, "Go Head", and accompanying music video were released on July 31, 2007.

ATLA 
Daz Dillinger (Tha Dogg Pound) and Big Gipp have just released the first single off of their upcoming collaborative album, titled "One Day at a Time". The album is called, "A.T.L.A.", and was released on April 19, 2020.

Gipp N Worthy 
Big Gipp and James Worthy released a collaborative EP entitled "Gipp N Worthy" February 17, 2023. The first single off of the project is "TOTW".

Discography

Solo albums 
Mutant Mindframe (2003)

Collaboration albums 
Kinfolk with Ali (2007)
ATLA with Daz Dillinger (2020)
Gipp N Worthy with James Worthy (2023)

Solo singles 
"Steppin' Out" with Sleepy Brown (2003)
Hot (2008)
"Shine Like Gold" with CeeLo Green (2014)
 "Big Gipp" with SVG KING (2017)
 "TOTW" with James Worthy (2023)

Guest appearances 
Big Gipp gained radio airplay when he was featured in Nelly's hit song Grillz with Jermaine Dupri, Paul Wall, and Ali. He has collaborated individually with artists including OutKast, 8 Ball & MJG, Mack 10, BG, Rehab, Lil' Flip, UGK, Witchdoctor, Da Backwudz, Three 6 Mafia, Chace Infinite of Self Scientific, Monica, Kurupt, Mr. Cheeks of Lost Boyz, Solé, Xzibit, J. Wells, Pharoahe Monch, JT Money, RZA of Wu-Tang Clan, Thrill da Playa of 69 Boyz, Jev, Youngbloodz, Techniec, Dead Prez, N.O.R.E., Devin the Dude, Too Short, Kokane, Ludacris, C-Murder, Jagged Edge, James Worthy, Bubba Sparxxx, and Lil Jon,.

References 

Living people
1972 births
American male rappers
Dungeon Family members
Epic Records artists
Rappers from Atlanta
Southern hip hop musicians
Goodie Mob members
21st-century American rappers